Joseph Smith is an American football coach and former player. He is the head football coach at Linfield College in McMinnville, Oregon, a position he has held since 2006.

Head coaching record

References

External links
 Linfield profile

Year of birth missing (living people)
Living people
American football cornerbacks
Linfield Wildcats football coaches
Linfield Wildcats football players
Oregon State University alumni
Place of birth missing (living people)